AppleJack was a command-line interface for Mac OS X that provided a simplified user interface for single user mode system repairs. It allowed for permission repair, disk repair, cache cleaning, validation of preference- and property list files, and removal of swap files on a boot drive, without needing a separate startup disk.

With the introduction of the recovery partition in Mac OS X Lion and above, AppleJack development has ceased.

References

External links
 
 
 AppleJack article at MacFixIt

Utilities for macOS
Discontinued software